James Matthew Coles (born 2 April 2004) is an English cricketer who plays for Sussex. He made his first-class debut on 6 September 2020, for Sussex in the 2020 Bob Willis Trophy.

Career
At the age of 12, Coles joined the Sussex academy, and he has represented them at the Bunbury Festival. He has also played for Aston Rowant in the Oxfordshire cricket league, and in 2020, he scored a century on his Oxfordshire debut against Buckinghamshire. At the age of 16 years and 157 days old, Coles became the youngest player to appear in a first-class match for the county. The record had been held by John Mare since 1870.

He has received the Oxford Junior Sportsman of the Year award and Sir John ‘Jack’ Hobbs Silver Jubilee Memorial Prize for the most outstanding under-16 schoolboy cricketer in England. He made his List A debut on 23 July 2021, for Sussex in the 2021 Royal London One-Day Cup.

In December 2021, he was named in England's team for the 2022 ICC Under-19 Cricket World Cup in the West Indies.

Personal life
Coles was a pupil at Magdalen College School, Oxford, up until 2022.

References

External links
 

2004 births
Living people
English cricketers
Oxfordshire cricketers
Sussex cricketers
Sportspeople from Aylesbury